Laetifautor rubropunctatus is a species of sea snail, a marine gastropod mollusk in the family Calliostomatidae.

Description
The small, buffish shell has an orbiculate-conic shape. It is ornamented with transverse spinulose cinguli (4 on the body whorl). The interstices are clathrate, beautifully dotted with red.

This species is readily recognized by its peculiar painting and remarkable sculpture. A.Adams describes the color as "lutescens." G.W. Tryon rather considers it pale fleshy pink, with dark red dots in the interstices between the oblique costae and the transverse or spiral ridges. The latter are said to be four in number on the body whorl. But on careful examination Tryon found six, of which four are, however, more prominent than the rest. The upper volutions are encircled by three principal lirae, and a fourth secondary one at the suture. The points of intersection of these spiral ridges and the oblique costse are produced into quite acute nodules or prickles. The base of the shell is almost flat, ornamented with about six concentric lirae, which are more or less granulous, with the interstices exhibiting strong lines of growth and translucent nacre. The color closely approaches the rest of the surface, varied with brown dots both upon and between the granules.

Distribution
This marine species occurs off Japan, the Philippines and Australia.

References

 Smith, E.A. (1884). Mollusca. pp. 34–116, pl. 4–7 in Report on the zoological collections made in the Indo-Pacific Ocean during the voyage of H.M.S. 'Alert' 1881–82. London : British Museum.
 Wilson, B. (1993). Australian Marine Shells. Prosobranch Gastropods. Kallaroo, WA : Odyssey Publishing. Vol.1 1st Edn pp. 1–408
 Marshall, B.A. (1995). Calliostomatidae (Gastropoda: Trochoidea) from New Caledonia, the Loyalty Islands and the northern Lord Howe Rise. pp. 381–458 in Bouchet, P. (ed.). Résultats des Campagnes MUSORSTOM, Vol. 14 . Mém. Mus. nat. Hist. nat. 167 : 381–458
 Higo, S., Callomon, P. & Goto, Y. (1999). Catalogue and bibliography of the marine shell-bearing Mollusca of Japan. Osaka. : Elle Scientific Publications. 749 pp.
 Poppe G.T. (2004) Descriptions of spectacular new species from the Philippines (Gastropoda – Trochidae, Cypraeidae). Visaya 1(1): 4–19. page(s): 5

External links
 To Encyclopedia of Life
 To World Register of Marine Species

rubropunctatus
Gastropods described in 1851